IAB may refer to:

Organisations
 Institute of Architects Bangladesh, a professional organisation for architects in Bangladesh
 Interactive Advertising Bureau, an organization that develops industry standards, conducts research, and provides legal support for the online advertising industry
 Internal Affairs Bureau of the New York City Police Department
 International Agrarian Bureau, or "Green International"
 International Association of Book-keepers, UK
 International Association of Bryologists, the study of mosses, liverworts, and hornworts
 Internet Advertising Bureau, UK trade association
 Internet Architecture Board, Internet Society committee
 Israel Association of Baseball

Air force bases
 Isa Air Base, Bahrain
 McConnell Air Force Base (IATA airport code), Wichita, Kansas, US

Other uses
 IAB meteorite
 International Accounting Bulletin, a UK accountancy publication
 Individual Address Block, in computer networking
 Internal Affairs Bureau, part of the New York City Police Department